Drive is the eleventh studio album by American country music artist Steve Wariner. It was released on July 27, 1993 via Arista Nashville. The album produced four chart singles on the Billboard country charts in "If I Didn't Love You" at number 8, "Drivin' and Cryin'" at number 24, "It Won't Be over You" at number 18, and the title track at number 63.

Critical reception
Patrick Davitt of The Leader-Post (Regina, Saskatchewan) rated the album 3 out of 5 stars. The reviewer felt that "It Won't Be Over You" was a "hard, bright highlight", while comparing "Drivin' and Cryin'" favorably to the Eagles, as well as the "simpler country tunes" of "(You Could Always) Come Back" and "The Same Mistake Again". He criticized the "unbearably thick and heavy choruses" of "Missing You" and "Married to a Memory", but praised "Sails" as a "pretty" song.

Track listing

Production
Produced & Mixed By Scott Hendricks
Assistant Producer: John Kunz
Engineered By Keith Boden, Mike Bradley, Tony Collins, Jon Dickson, Scott Hendricks, Clark Hook, Mike Janas & John Kunz
Mastered By Denny Purcell
Digital Editing By Don Cobb

Credits
 Grace Bahng – cello
 Eddie Bayers – drums
 Bill Cuomo – synthesizer
 David Davidson – violin
 Stuart Duncan – fiddle
 Paul Franklin – steel guitar
 Connie Heard – violin
 Carl Jackson – background vocals
 John Barlow Jarvis – keyboards, piano
 Bill LaBounty – background vocals
 Dave Loggins – background vocals
 Mac McAnally – acoustic guitar, background vocals
 Brent Mason – electric guitar
 Michael Rhodes – bass guitar
 Tom Roady – drums
 Harry Stinson – background vocals
 Catherine Styron – keyboards
 Billy Thomas – background vocals
 Steve Wariner – lead vocals, background vocals, electric guitar, acoustic guitar
 Kristin Wilkinson – viola

Chart performance

References

1993 albums
Albums produced by Scott Hendricks
Arista Records albums
Steve Wariner albums